A sanderling is a wading bird.

Sanderling may also refer to:

People
 Kurt Sanderling (19122011), German conductor
 Michael Sanderling (born 1967), German conductor and violoncellist, son of Kurt Sanderling
 Stefan Sanderling (born 1964), German conductor, son of Kurt Sanderling
 Thomas Sanderling (born 1942), German conductor, son of Kurt Sanderling

Other
 USS Sanderling, several ships of the U.S. Navy

See also 
 Sanderling Beach Club, a historic building in Sarasota, Florida, United States